The 2015 WK League was the seventh season of the WK League, the top division of women's football in South Korea. The regular season began on 16 March 2015 and ended on 5 October 2015. Incheon Hyundai Steel Red Angels were the defending champions.

 Goyang Daekyo changed name to Icheon Daekyo and relocated from Goyang to Icheon 
 Busan Sangmu changed name to Boeun and relocated from Busan to Boeun
 Daejeon Sportstoto changed name to Gumi Sportstoto and relocated from Daejeon to Gumi
 Jeonbuk KSPO changed name to Hwacheon KSPO and relocated from Jeonbuk to Hwacheon

Teams

Table

Results

Matches 1 to 14

Matches 15 to 28

Play-offs
The semi-final was played as a single-elimination match, and the Championship Final over two legs.

Semi-final

Championship final
First leg

Second leg

Incheon Hyundai Steel Red Angels won 4–3 on aggregate.

References

External links
WK League official website 
2015 WK League on RSSSF
2015 WK League on Soccerway

2015
Women
South Korea
South Korea